The Perryville Stakes is an American Thoroughbred horse race run annually during October at the Keeneland Race Course in Lexington, Kentucky. The race is open to three-year-old horses. Currently a Grade III event, it offers a purse of $150,000.

Winners 
El Brujo won the race in 2009 by 1 lengths in a time of 1:25.95.

The race was not run in 2010.

Resources

Horse races in Kentucky